The Syrian branch of Hezbollah is a Syrian armed group fighting in the Syrian Civil War. The group is directly trained by Lebanese Hezbollah, the IRGC, and the Syrian Armed Forces. The group has troops deployed in Damascus, Aleppo, Daraa, and Quneitra. The groups has also participated in the anti–Israel conflict. Quwat al-Ridha has obscure links with Syrian Hezbollah.

References

Hezbollah
Hezbollah involvement in the Syrian civil war
Pro-government factions of the Syrian civil war
Military units and formations established in 2012
2012 establishments in Syria
Anti-ISIL factions in Syria
Syrian Shia organizations
Jihadist groups in Syria